The Invisible Woman (Sue Storm Richards) is a fictional Marvel Comics character, who has had many alternative versions through various media.

1602

In the miniseries Marvel 1602, Susan Storm is a member of the Four from the Fantastick, in reference to the ship upon which she and three others gained their powers in the Sargasso Sea. Unlike in the Marvel Universe, she is weightless and cannot become visible. She is related to the alchemical element of air as stated by Neil Gaiman.

At the start of Marvel 1602: Fantastick Four, Susan is visibly pregnant with Sir Richard Reed's child. He forbids her to join him in his pursuit of Otto von Doom while in this condition, but she goes anyway. Much to Miss Doris Evans' shock, Sir Richard and Susan are not married. She displays the ability to create force fields but becomes visible when doing so.

Adam Warlock

On Counter Earth, counterparts of the Fantastic Four hijack an experimental spaceship in order to be the first humans in space. Man-Beast negates the effects of the cosmic radiation for all of them except Reed Richards who succumbs to the effects a decade later. When their craft crashes, Sue Storm falls into a coma from which she does not awake.

Age of Apocalypse

In the alternative reality known as the Age of Apocalypse, Susan never became the Invisible Woman, but instead helped her boyfriend Reed Richards in his attempt to evacuate a large group of humans from Manhattan when Apocalypse came into power. Along with Ben Grimm as the pilot and her brother Johnny as crew, they used one of Reed's prototype rockets to fly off the island. However, a mutant sabotaged the launch and both Reed and Johnny sacrificed themselves to let the others blast off safely.

Susie and Ben join the Human High Council as hired muscle. They are sent to the Eurasian Security Field Command Center to retrieve Bruce Banner, the scientist who worked on the nuclear warhead project that made the Council's pre-emptive nuclear strike possible.  They found the facilities barraged by a Thing. The two are able to defeat the monster and retrieve Banner so they can board Mikhail Rasputin's mothership as one of a few select representatives allowed to board the Horseman's vessel as part of a false peace convoy. The humans are hoodwinked and held captive on the ship until Tony Stark, another captive on Mikhail's vessel, short circuits the craft with his mechanized heart. After they are freed, Ben and Susan help with the evacuation of the humans, piloting the ships after Banner to unify all the transfer arks into a single fleet used to flee from Earth.

Age of Ultron

In the Age of Ultron story, Invisible Woman is the only surviving member of the Fantastic Four, and joins a group of surviving heroes. The group goes to the Savage Land to find Nick Fury, with a plan of going forward in time to destroy Ultron in the future, where he is coordinating his attack. Wolverine, however, believes they should go back in time and kill Hank Pym before he creates Ultron, arguing Pym would see a warning not to create the robot as a challenge, and create Ultron regardless.

The group decides against this, and several members go to the future. Wolverine then goes to the past, with the intent of assassinating Pym. Invisible Woman stows away with him in hopes of convincing him otherwise. When Wolverine attacks Pym, Invisible Woman creates a force field to stop the killing blow.  Torn between Hank's pleas for help, and Wolverine's reminders of what will happen if he lives, Sue allows Wolverine to kill Pym. After the consequences of this decision were realized, Wolverine went back to this point again and convinced his past self to stand down.  The Wolverines and Sue manage to help Pym create a backdoor in Ultron's programming that will stop him before he can launch his attack in the first place.

Age of X

In the Age of X reality where mutants are hunted, Sue is the only free member of the Fantastic Four left after she betrayed the other three to the government for harboring a mutant after the mutant attacked Franklin. Unlike some of her colleagues in the mutant-hunting Avengers, Sue merely wishes to contain mutants rather than kill them, and eventually sacrifices herself to save the mutant retreat from a suicide bombing by her former teammate, the Hulk.

Exiles

Sue has appeared many times in the pages of Exiles. First, she was married to Black Bolt and helped him defeat that reality's tyrannical dictator Iron Man. More recently, another version of Sue has appeared as Madame Hydra (Empress Hydra), controller of Captain America, Slaymaster, and Wolverine. She has even developed romantic feelings for Wolverine. This version of Sue has killed billions and plans to move onto other Earths. Along with the Exiles, she is opposed by that reality's Reed Richards and Elektra. After the Exiles defeated her, she escaped into another dimension and began recruiting villains defeated by the Exiles across various dimensions to form a team to defeat them. In another reality, she was the only survivor of the test flight that endowed her with her powers. Rescued by Namor, she subsequently marries him and bears him two children, Gambit and Valeria Fen.

Earth-65
In Ghost-Spider's universe, Susan and Johnny Storm went missing on a trip to Latveria. When they return to New York, they are shown twisted to evil and murderers of their own mother.

Marvel Apes

In the alternative universe of Marvel Apes, the Invisible Girl is an ape who unwillingly turns human after gaining her powers. This causes her great distress. She reaches out in friendship to another human, Charles Darwin, also stranded in the ape-verse. Later, she assists in the defense of her universe against zombie invaders. She is flash-fried and consumed by her zombie 'brother'.

Marvel Mangaverse

In the alternative universe of the Marvel Mangaverse, the Invisible Girl is Sioux Storm. Her half-sister is Jonatha Storm. Sioux has near psychosis-level emotional detachment and may suffer from Borderline personality disorder. In order to get her to fight or show any interest, Reed has programmed her battle suit to inject near-overdoses of battle stimulants and aggressor hormones into her bloodstream. She is a member of the Megascale Metatalent Response Team Fantastic Four. The team uses power packs that allow them to manifest at mecha-sized levels. The team fights Godzilla-sized monsters from various alien xenocultures that attack Earth in order to put an end to experiments that endanger all of reality. In Mangaverse volume 1 the team destroys a mecha-like Annihilus.

In New Mangaverse Sioux is murdered by ninja assassins dispatched by the Hand.

Marvel Zombies

The Marvel Zombies universe's version of Reed Richards deliberately infected his team, including Sue, with the zombie virus, following madness from the murder of their children at the hands of a zombified She-Hulk. The Zombie Fantastic Four subsequently make contact with their Ultimate counterparts, attempting to escape into the Ultimate Marvel universe. Zombie Reed is neutralized when the Ultimate Invisible Girl destroys a chunk of his brain. After a brief period of imprisonment, Sue and the zombie Fantastic Four are killed by Ultimate Doctor Doom and returned to their universe.

MC2

In the MC2 universe, Sue and Reed recently returned from space, where Sue had been holding back a rift in reality with her force powers.  Sue is instrumental in battling Galactus during the Last Planet Standing miniseries in which she deployed psionic force fields to prevent a tsunami from leveling New York.

Mutant X

In the darker reality of Mutant X, Sue does not have superpowers, but wears a high tech "stealth" suit. She is shown dead along with several other super heroes who attempted to stop the Beyonder.

Ultimate Marvel

The Ultimate Marvel version of Susan Storm is an eighteen-year-old biochemistry prodigy who grew up in the Baxter Building in the gifted and talented program supervised by her father. Though her newfound fame and beauty has brought her unsought attention from the likes of billionaire playboy Tony Stark, the former Baxter Building scientist turned villain, Mole Man, the Atlantean criminal Namor, and even her own friend and teammate, Ben Grimm, she remains romantically attached to Reed Richards despite her concerns about his over devotion to science. Throughout the series, Sue has been a major player in events such as Ultimate Secret and Ultimate Power. In Ultimate Salem's Seven, Sue Storm leaves Reed Richards and moves to Oregon to study a bizarre sentient organism. It has been shown that this organism is responsible for creating the Salem's Seven. She returns to Oregon to destroy the creature with Namor and the rest of her team.  In the ensuing explosion Reed is trapped by molten lava.  When Sue saves him with her invisible force field, they reconcile. She would later play a part in the Ultimatum event where she pushes back a tidal wave that floods New York with a colossal psionic field. She saves the city, but the mental strain puts her into a deep coma. She would later be awoken from her coma through the combined efforts of Mole Man and the Thing, during the course of which it is revealed that Ben harbors romantic feelings towards Susan. After the Ultimatum Sue breaks up with Reed and follows in her mother's footsteps after proposing to Ben. She is later assaulted, along with other heroes, by Reed, who had turned to villainy.

An alternative version of Sue appears as Kang the Conqueror guiding Reed as The Maker to prevent destruction of their planet by Galactus while forming a "Dark Ultimates" to combat the Ultimates.

This version of Sue Storm is an accomplished scientist in her own right. Reed even describes her as "just a teeny bit smarter than him", but when Reed once mentioned this to Ben, Susan responded with "Reed is an idiot," as she always envies Reed's abilities and considers him the "king of physics". (See Ultimate Fantastic Four Quotes) It is Sue who does research into the biomolecular basis of the Fantastic Four's powers and she manages to understand how Reed's and her brother Johnny's powers as Mister Fantastic and the Human Torch work.

What If? 

Marvel's What If? comic book series featured several alternative versions of Sue Storm and the Fantastic Four.

Spider-Man in the FF
On the world designated Earth-772, in What If?, Spider-Man joined the Fantastic Four, but his presence resulted in Sue feeling increasingly sidelined in favour of the four male members of the team, resulting in her leaving the team to marry the Sub-Mariner. Although Reed was briefly driven insane and declared war on Atlantis, he eventually recovered and the two apparently reconciled, resulting in the 'Fantastic Five' reforming once again in time to confront Annihilus in the Negative Zone to help Susan give birth.

Vol. I #6
In What If? #6 (Dec 1977), after the team are exposed to cosmic rays, they develop powers based on their personalities. Sue Storm gains the ability to stretch and reshape her body, because her personality caused her to try to fit in with the more dominating friends, while Reed Richards vast intellect causes him to become a giant floating brain. Sue takes the name "Ultra Woman" in this reality.

This version of the Fantastic Four reappeared in the Volume II story arc 'Timestorm', summoned by the Watcher to persuade the man who would become Kang/Immortus not to become a threat. Sue, along with the other members of this alternative Fantastic Four, are killed by Immortus.

Vol. I #11
In What If? Volume 1, #11 (May 1978), an alternative universe is shown wherein the original 1960's staff of Marvel Comics are exposed to cosmic rays Skrulls.  Then Marvel Comics secretary Flo Steinberg gains the powers of the Invisible Girl.  Together with Stan Lee, Jack Kirby, and Sol Brodsky, she continues to work by day at Marvel Comics, while operating in secret as a member of the Fantastic Four.

Vol. II #11
In What If? vol. 2 #11 (March 1990), the origins of the Fantastic Four are retold, showing how the heroes lives would have changed if all four had gained the same powers as the individual members of the original Fantastic Four.

Fire Powers: In this alternative history the cosmic rays give the four the powers of the Human Torch. They decide to use their powers for good, and become the Fantastic Four. They battle such menaces as the Mole Man and the alien race Skrulls. During a battle with the mystic Miracle Man, the villain brings to life a statue advertising a monster movie called "The Monster from Mars." When the heroes set fire to the statue, the fire spreads to a local apartment building, killing young Angelica Parsons. Feeling responsible for Parsons's death, the team disbands. Sue, troubled by Angelica's death, becomes a nun.
Elastic powers: In this alternative history, Reed, Sue, Johnny, and Ben develop the ability to stretch. Deciding not to become superheroes, Ben and Sue discover their love for one another and settle down to raise a family, never using their stretching powers again. 
Monstrous forms: The cosmic rays in this alternative history transform the four into monstrous creatures, with Sue taking on a mindless form similar to Man-Thing. When the public reacts with fright at their appearances, they choose to leave civilization and live on Monster Isle.
Invisibility powers: In the final What If? story, Ben Grimm, Reed Richards, Johnny Storm, and Sue Storm gain different aspects of the mainstream Sue Storm's power. Sue can turn invisible, Reed can project invisibility, Ben projects invisible force-fields, and Johnny can become intangible. They join Colonel Nick Fury's new C.I.A. unit, codenamed S.H.I.E.L.D. The story retells their initial encounter with Doctor Doom under these circumstances.

References

Invisible Woman
Fantastic Four
Fictional characters from parallel universes